"He's Mine" is a song by R&B girl group MoKenStef released as the first single from their debut album Azz Izz. It was the group's biggest hit, peaking at No. 7 on the U.S. Billboard Hot 100 chart during the summer of 1995. It sold 600,000 copies and was certified gold by the RIAA. The song samples "Be Alright" by Zapp and "Do Me, Baby" by Prince. A remix by Grand Puba features samples of Patrice Rushen's "Remind Me" and Doug E. Fresh & Slick Rick's "La Di Da Di."

Music videos
Two different music videos for the song were released. The original version was filmed and released in May 1995. The second version for the remix was filmed in September 1995 and released in November 1995.

Formats and track listings
US CD single
 "He's Mine" (L.P. Version) (4:13)
 "He's Mine" (Instrumental L.P. Version) (4:13)

US CD maxi single
 "He's Mine" (Album Version) (4:13)
 "He's Mine" (Instrumental L.P. Version) (4:13)
 "I Got Him All The Time" (He's Mine Remix) (3:59)
 "It Goes On"

Charts

Weekly charts

References

1995 debut singles
Songs written by Prince (musician)
Songs written by Roger Troutman
Contemporary R&B ballads
New jack swing songs
MoKenStef songs
Songs written by Larry Troutman